Crassiclitellata is an order of annelids belonging to the class Clitellata.

Families:
 Acanthodrilidae
 Benhamiidae
 Eudrilidae
 Hippoperidae
 Komarekionidae
 Lumbricidae
 Lutodrilidae
 Sparganophilidae
 Tumakidae
 Typhaeidae

References

Annelids